Sweet Revival is the second album by American organist Ronnie Foster recorded in 1972 and released on the Blue Note label.

Reception
The Allmusic review by Stephen Thomas Erlewine awarded the album 4 stars and stated "Although the album sounds dated, the grooves are funky, and Sweet Revival remains one of the most engaging records of groovy, jazzy funk-soul of its era".

Track listing

Personnel
Ronnie Foster - organ 
Garnett Brown - trombone
Seldon Powell - tenor saxophone
Ernie Hayes - electric piano
David Spinozza, John Tropea - electric guitar
Wilbur Bascomb Jr. - electric bass
Bernard Purdie - drums
Horace Ott - arranger, conductor
Unidentified percussion, horns, strings and female vocal group

References 

Blue Note Records albums
Ronnie Foster albums
1972 albums
Albums arranged by Horace Ott